Romania's national currency is the leu. After Romania joined the European Union (EU) in 2007, the country became required to replace the leu with the euro once it meets all four euro convergence criteria, as stated in article 140 of the Treaty on the Functioning of the European Union. As of 2022, the only currency on the market is the leu and the euro is not yet used in shops. The Romanian leu is not part of the European Exchange Rate Mechanism (ERM II), although Romanian authorities are working to prepare the changeover to the euro. To achieve the currency changeover, Romania must undergo at least two years of stability within the limits of the convergence criteria. The current Romanian government established a self-imposed criterion to reach a certain level of real convergence as a steering anchor to decide the appropriate target year for ERM II membership and Euro adoption. In March 2018, the National Plan for the Adoption of the Euro scheduled the date for euro adoption in Romania as 2024. Nevertheless, in early 2021, this date was postponed to 2027 or 2028, and once again to 2029 in late 2021 and then pushed to 2026.

History

First changes in the Romanian currency 
Romania has been an open economy with free capital flow since September 2006, and with total foreign trade exceeding 75% of Gross Domestic Product (GDP) (Isărescu 2007).

Romania's financial market is developing, and experts have noted a trend toward greater efficiency of stock exchange transactions. Consequently, inflows of portfolio investments appear likely to increase. This could become a resource to address the current account deficit. Remittances from Romanian people who work abroad are expected to maintain high levels in the short term. Nevertheless, the country's accession to the EU also gives rise to a new resource capable of covering the deficit, namely transfers from structural and cohesive funds to Romania, as a cohesion country that would be achieved starting in 2008.

The first step required to prepare for the changeover of the leu to the euro took place at the same time as depreciation of the national currency. In 2005 the new Romanian leu was printed with the same physical dimensions as the euro in order to fit the Union's automatic teller machine (ATM) system.

In 2006, the Romanian government announced that the new plan to join the ERM II (a prerequisite for euro adoption) would take place only after 2012 because of significant impediments such as price instability and high interest rates. The president of the European Central Bank said in June 2007 that "Romania has a lot of homework to do... over a number of years" before joining ERM II. The Romanian government announced in December 2009 their official plan to join the Eurozone by 1 January 2015.

In 2011, the Romanian government announced it would work to comply with the first four convergence criteria by 2013, but the economy would need further reforms to successfully change to the euro.

The delays in adhering to the ERM II 
In 2012, the governor of the National Bank of Romania (BNR) confirmed that Romania would not meet its target to join the Eurozone in 2015. He addressed the benefits for Romania to not being a part of the euro area during the European debt crisis, but said that the country would strive to comply with all convergence criteria. Concerns about Romania's workforce productivity were also cited for the delay.

In 2013, Romania submitted their annual Convergence Program to the European Commission, which did not specify a target date for euro adoption. Prime Minister Victor Ponta stated that Eurozone entry is still a fundamental objective for Romania but they cannot enter unprepared, making 2020 a more realistic entry date.

At the same time, the BNR submitted draft amendments for the Romanian Constitution to the European Central Bank (ECB) for review. The amendments would make the BNR's statute an organic law to ensure "institutional and functional stability" and would allow for "transfer of BNR tasks to the ECB and introduction of the Euro as legal tender".

In 2014, Romania's Convergence Report set the target date for the euro adoption as 1 January 2019. According to the Erste Group Bank, Romania would be unable to meet this ambitious target by 2019, not in regard to complying with the four nominal convergence criteria values, but in reaching appropriate levels of real convergence (i.e., raising the GDP per capita from 50% to a level above 60% of the EU average) ahead of euro adoption.

The Romanian Central Bank governor, Mugur Isărescu, admitted the target was challenging, but obtainable if the political parties passed a legal roadmap for implementing required reforms. This roadmap appeared able to lead Romania to entering the ERM II on 1 January 2017 so that the euro could be adopted after two years of ERM II membership on 1 January 2019.

In 2015, however, Isărescu again argued for a delay in the changeover to the euro. Ahead of ERM II entry, Romania would need to conduct monetary adjustments by finalizing the process to bring minimum reserve requirement ratios in line with Eurozone levels. Isărescu predicted the process would take twelve to eighteen months; Romania needed to complete major economic policy adjustments by:

 removing the sources of repressed inflation (i.e., completion of energy market deregulation);
 removing sources of quasi-fiscal deficits (by restructuring loss-making state-owned enterprises);
 removing other sources of future budgetary pressures (i.e., unavoidable expenditures to modernise road infrastructure).

In June 2015, Romania's Prime Minister Victor Ponta said he was open to the idea of holding a referendum on euro adoption.  However, the decisive trio, the President, BNR Governor and Finance Minister did not consider this option.

The target for "real convergence" ahead of euro adoption is for Romania's GDP per capita, in terms of purchasing power, to be above 60% of the average figure for the  EU. Forecasts predicted this could reach 65% in 2018 and 71% in 2020, after having risen from 29% in 2002 to 54% in 2014.

The Romanian government also expressed commitment to join all pillars of the Banking Union as soon as possible. However, in September 2015 Isărescu said that the 2019 target was no longer realistic. The Romanian foreign minister, Teodor Meleșcanu, declared on 28 August 2017 that as the country "meet(s) all formal requirements", Romania "could join the currency union even tomorrow". However, he thought Romania "will adopt the euro in five years, in 2022". In March 2018, members of the Social Democratic Party (PSD) voted at an extraordinary congress to back a 2024 target date to adopt the euro currency.

In February 2021, the Romanian Prime Minister, Florin Cîțu, announced that the date for Romanian adoption of the euro would be delayed again to 2027 or 2028. Then, in December 2021, the first deputy governor of the BNR, said that the date would be once again delayed to 2029.

Current perspectives
There is no pressure on Romania to adhere to ERM in a certain year, followed by the adoption of the euro two years later. The EU Member States can use the derogation clause to prevent Romania from entering into ERM, and hold on to their monetary policies as a buffer against external shocks. The EU Commission and the European Council have not urged Romania, a euro candidate country, to join the Eurozone and it is not likely to happen in the future, due to rising doubts in Brussels and in capitals of some current Eurozone members regarding the wisdom of further Eurozone enlargement. Therefore, Romania has enough time to establish economic conditions under which the loss of monetary and fiscal sovereignty would be less painful.

Monetary and exchange rate policies 
In Romania, the main objective of the BNR is to ensure and maintain price stability while concurrently promoting the Government's general economic policy. As stated in Article 2 of Law 312/2004, the National Bank is responsible for defining and implementing the monetary policy strategy (Direct inflation targeting) and the exchange rate policy.

Over the years, the BNR has supported the monetary policy by progressively decreasing the policy rate. The first step achieved was between February 2009 and March 2012, when the BNR cut the policy rate by a cumulative 500 basis points, to 5.25%, followed by rapid decreases in the annual inflation rate, which made it possible for the BNR to resume downward adjustment of the policy rate. Between July 2013 and February 2014, the BNR cut the policy rate by a cumulative 175 basis points, to 3.5%.

Romania has managed floating exchange rates and is in line with using inflation targets as a nominal anchor for monetary policy and to enable flexible policy responses to unpredictable shocks that would potentially affect the economy. Reasons for not entering the euro area are complex, covering national problems, including insufficient economic convergence over a lacking perceived attractiveness of euro membership, as well as an unresolved institutional reform agenda (Backé and Dvorsky 2018).

Preparing the changeover to the euro
Disclaimer of the monetary policy instrument. Responsibility for monetary policy and exchange rate would pass to the European Central Bank, leaving Romania without the ability to control an important monetary policy instrument (the monetary policy interest rate) and giving up to the exchange rate, another instrument that contributes to adjusting the economy, especially during recessions.

Convergence. In order to suffer a smaller cost from the currency changeover, the structural, real and institutional convergence must be as high as possible. Business cycles must be synchronized (periods of economic downturn and economic growth to be simultaneous in Romania and in the Eurozone). In general, Romania is a quarter-lagged room against the Eurozone economy. Hence, the effects of the ECB's monetary policy will have an asymmetrical effect. The decision to change to the euro currency is not appropriate to the phase of Romania's economic cycle.

Control of macroeconomics balances. Romania must maintain the balance of macroeconomics: in the private sector (low debt rate), in the budgetary sector (a low budget deficit) and in the external sector (a stable balance).

An alternative instrument for interest rate and exchange rate. By renouncing the two instruments, Romania needs to find a substitute tool: economists usually recommend the flexibility of the labour market, the flexibility of wages and mobility of production factors.

It is an exercise of will and power. The ambitious objective can bring Romania a solid, robust economy. Also, if Romania enters unprepared into the EU, the benefits will be smaller than the costs.

The Committee for Preparing the Changeover to the Euro 
The Committee for Preparing the Changeover to the Euro at the National Bank of Romania was originally established in 2011. The committee's original scope was to work as an advisory body to analyze aspects related to euro adoption. Another objective was to serve as a genuine platform for discussion and representatives of other public authorities were invited to attend its meetings.

The Committee's present objective relays an in-depth, comprehensive analysis within the BNR and a strong relationship among board members with the heads of central bank departments, to keep them informed about the aspects related to euro adoption. The Committee keeps its initial role as a platform for discussion because it fosters an inter-institutional dialogue to raise awareness among competent authorities about the fiscal and structural reforms necessary to provide the Romanian economy more flexibility as they changeover to the Euro.

The Committee's main topics of discussion are:

 the experience of other EU member states in preparation for changeover to the euro;
 the stage of Romania's preparation for adoption of the euro;
 the new mechanisms and concepts developed at the EU in the field of economic governance and strengthening of the Economic and Monetary Union;
 the documents of the European Commission, the European Central Bank and the Government of Romania regarding the convergence to the Eurozone of the derogating member states.

The National Commission for the foundation of the national plan for the adoption of the euro 
In 2018, the Government established through a Government Emergency Ordinance a new body to help achieve sufficient convergence before changing to the euro, the National Commission for foundation of the plan for adoption of the euro. During the functioning of this National Commission, the Committee's activity would be suspended.

The National Commission tasks which have a direct impact on criteria of legal convergence are:

a) elaboration of the National Plan for transition to the Euro and of the timetable of actions necessary for adoption of the euro;

b) evaluation of the stage of meeting the convergence criteria;

c) evaluation of the current legislative framework and preparation of new legislative projects for the introduction of the euro;

d) preparing the national statistical system for updating the data series;

e) monitoring the preparation of national systems for the changeover to the euro, the modification/compatibility of the payment system and the national accounting;

f) identifying necessary actions and entities involved to organize information campaigns for the general public about adoption of the euro, developing and updating dedicated sites and setting up information help points for citizens and companies. The National Commission will ensure that the public is informed clearly, objectively and in a timely and accurate manner about the adoption of the Euro;

g) establishing and monitoring specific elements, respectively the parallel circulation of the national currency and the Euro, as well as the display of prices in the national currency and in Euros;

h) drawing up periodic working reports and sending them to the institutions involved.

Convergence criteria

Public opinion
Public support for the Euro in Romania

A Flash Eurobarometer from 2019 showed that a majority of Romanian respondents support introducing the Euro on the national market. With a decrease of 8 percentage points, 61% of Romanians are in favour of Euro adoption. 

When referring to the positive impact of the changeover from the national currency to the Euro, 52% of the Romanian respondents think that the common currency had a positive impact on the Eurozone Member States that already use it.

An April 2022 Eurobarometer poll showed strong support for the Euro in Romania. According to the poll, 65 percent responded yes to the question "Do you think the introduction of the euro would have positive or negative consequences for Romania? (33 percent responded no). In the same poll, 77 percent responded yes to the question "Generally speaking, are you personally more in favour or against the idea of introducing the euro in Romania? (22 percent responded no).

See also 
 
 2007 enlargement of the European Union
 Enlargement of the Eurozone

Notes

References

Economy of Romania
Euro by country
Euro
Euro